The Muckrakers were a rock band from Long Island, New York formed in 1997. This band has been inactive since 2009.

Early days
The band started as a duo, with current lead singer-songwriter Rob Carpenter and singer-guitarist John Ruby. The two met at Western Kentucky University (both were history majors). Shortly after meeting the two began playing all over Bowling Green, Kentucky, from dorm rooms to coffee houses. Eventually though, the two began playing at a Bowling Green restaurant, Happy Inn, and began drawing substantial crowds.

Formation
Then the two got Brian Meurer, bassist, and together they recorded their first album, "Forgot To Breathe" (1998). Dave Kidd, drummer, joined the next year and the band began putting their music on MP3.com, which led to increased popularity and sales. This in turn allowed them to put out their second release in 2001, titled "Losing Sleep".

Recent developments
The Muckrakers continued playing and in 2004 were signed to Toucan Cove Entertainment/Label X. So with their label, the help of producer Todd Smith, and their newly added electric guitarist, Micah Gerdis, the Muckrakers released their first nationally released record, "Front of the Parade." In 2008, they released their follow-up album, The Concorde Fallacy.

On July 17, 2009, The Muckrakers played their final show at Headliner's Music Hall in Louisville. The 23-song setlist was recorded and later released for free.

Members
Kyler Sane – Guitar/Vocals
Shanon Munoz – Bass/Vocals
Jonathan Hoffmann – Drums

Discography

Albums
Dirty Water (2016)
The Album's Off (2018)

Videos
 Self Loathing
 Doomed
 Halloween Princess & Parasite

References

External links
Official Website
MySpace Page

Rock music groups from Kentucky
Musical groups from Louisville, Kentucky
Musical groups established in 1997
1997 establishments in Kentucky
2009 disestablishments in Kentucky
Musical groups disestablished in 2009